Worcester City Hospital was a public hospital in Worcester, Massachusetts from 1871 to 1991. It was established by an act of the Massachusetts state legislature and initially funded with a $200,000 donation from Worcester philanthropist George Jacques. The hospital was initially run out of the Abijah Bigelow house (at the corner of Front and Church Streets). As of 1988, the 271-bed hospital had an occupancy rate of only 39 percent. The hospital was closed in 1991 due to financial difficulty and its campus at 26 Queen Street now houses a non-profit community health center called the Family Health Center of Worcester.

References

External links 

Hospitals in Worcester, Massachusetts
Defunct hospitals in Massachusetts
1871 establishments in Massachusetts
Hospitals established in 1871
1991 disestablishments in Massachusetts
Hospitals disestablished in 1991